Daniel Webster is a marble sculpture depicting the American politician of the same name by Carl Conrads (after Thomas Ball), installed in the United States Capitol's National Statuary Hall, in Washington, D.C., as part of the National Statuary Hall Collection. The state was donated by the U.S. state of New Hampshire in 1894.

See also 
 Statue of Daniel Webster (Boston)
 Statue of Daniel Webster (New York City)
 Statue of Daniel Webster (Scott Circle)

References

External links

 

1894 establishments in Washington, D.C.
1894 sculptures
Daniel Webster
Marble sculptures in Washington, D.C.
Monuments and memorials in Washington, D.C.
Webster, Daniel
Sculptures of men in Washington, D.C.